Maria Theresa of Austria (21 March 1801 – 12 January 1855) was Queen of Sardinia by marriage to King Charles Albert of Sardinia. 

She was a daughter of Ferdinand III, Grand Duke of Tuscany and Luisa of Naples and Sicily. She was named after her great-grandmother Empress Maria Theresa. In 1817, she married Charles Albert of Sardinia and subsequently became the Queen of Sardinia upon her husband's accession to the throne in 1831.

Life

Early life 

Maria Theresia Franziska Josepha Johanna Benedikta (German) was a member of the Tuscan branch of the House of Habsburg-Lorraine, and an Archduchess of Austria and Princess of Bohemia, Hungary and Tuscany by birth. She was born in Vienna during the exile of her parents and their many children, due to Napoleon Bonaparte's invasion of Tuscany. Her father was Ferdinand III, Grand Duke of Tuscany and her mother was Princess Luisa of Naples and Sicily, who died giving birth to a stillborn son one year after Maria Theresa's birth.

In 1805, Ferdinand III was made Elector of the Electorate of Salzburg, and the family moved to Würzburg.

Marriage 

Maria Theresa married in Florence on 30 September 1817 to Charles Albert of Sardinia. A wedding mass was celebrated on 2 October in Florence Cathedral. In Italian, her name was Maria Teresa Francesca Giuseppa Giovanna Benedetta. From her marriage, she was known as the Princess of Carignano. 

She was described as innocent, naive and shy. 

In March 1820, an heir was born, followed by two more children, the latter of which died in infancy. In 1824, Charles Albert was recognised as heir to the throne by King Charles Felix.

Queen of Sardinia

Maria Theresa became Queen of Sardinia in 1831, when Charles Albert succeeded Charles Felix, who died without issue. 

During the reign of her spouse, Maria Theresa did not involve herself in state affairs, reportedly devoting her time solely to her family and religion. She was described as a strict Catholic but also as a spontaneous and affectionate family oriented person. 

A convinced Catholic, a fully converted fervent Italian Nationalist, and a new brand conservative who believed in checks and balances on royal power, she had a great influence on her eldest son on the new Italian throne.

Later life 

After the death of her husband in 1849 in Porto, the Queen mother, Maria Theresa, stopped appearing in public. 

While she never involved in politics as queen, she did engage in state affairs during the reign of her son. When the reforms against the priviligies of the Church was introduced by the Cavour government in 1854, she united with her daughter-in-law to pressure her son to prevent the reform with the argument that the reform was hostile against the Church and thus unacceptable for a Christian. The effort was, however, unsuccessful.  

She died in Turin, and is buried in the Basilica of Superga.

Issue

 Vittorio Emanuele Maria Alberto Eugenio Ferdinando Tommaso (14 March 1820 – 9 January 1878); married Adelaide of Austria and had issue. He would become the first king of united Italy.
 Ferdinando Maria Alberto Amedeo Filiberto Vincenzo (15 November 1822 – 10 February 1855); married Princess Elisabeth of Saxony and had issue. He became Duke of Genoa.
 Maria Cristina (4 July 1826 – 25 July 1827); died in infancy.

Genealogy 

Even among the frequently tangled genealogies of European nobility, the ancestry of Maria Theresa of Tuscany was unusual. In fact, her parents had the same four grandparents, so they were double cousins when they married: this practice of alliances between cousins was still common at that time, given that the families (and notably, including the parents and grandparents of Maria Theresa) had a lot of children, and this avoided dividing the benefit of heirs too much through alliances and their descendants, and the multiplication of nobility titles to satisfy the various claims by descendants.

As a consequence, her grandparents consisted of two brother/sister pairs. Her paternal grandfather, Leopold II, Holy Roman Emperor, was the brother of her maternal grandmother, Maria Carolina of Austria. Matching that combination, her paternal grandmother, Maria Luisa of Spain, was the sister of her maternal grandfather, Ferdinand I of the Two Sicilies. Because of this she only had four great-grandparents rather than the usual eight. (Although not so unusual, it may be worth pointing out that her grandmothers and great-grandmothers, as well as her mother or herself and her sister, or her daughter were all surnamed "Maria".)

References

1801 births
1855 deaths
Nobility from Vienna
House of Habsburg-Lorraine
Princesses of Savoy
Queen mothers
Sardinian queens consort
Austrian princesses
Burials at the Basilica of Superga
Italian nobility
Princesses of Carignan
Italian exiles
Daughters of monarchs